José Luis Alfonzo (born 1969 in San Luis Province, Argentina) is an Argentinian film actor.

He works in the cinema of Argentina.

Filmography
 De que estamos hechos (1987)
 Casas de fuego (1995) aka Houses of Fire
 Carlos Monzón, el segundo juicio (1996)
 Queréme así, piantao (1997) aka Astortango
 Cómplices (1998)
 Un Crisantemo Estalla en Cinco Esquinas (1998) aka A Crysanthemum Bursts in Cincoesquinas
 Secret of the Andes (1999)
 Los Días de la vida (2000)
 Campo de sangre (2001)
 Lugares comunes (2002) aka Common Ground
 Sin intervalo (2002)
 El Regreso (2003)
 Los Esclavos felices (la secta) (2004)
 Kidon (2005)
 Mañana (2005)
 Olga, Victoria Olga (2006)
 Chile 672 (2006)

Notes

External links
 

1969 births
Argentine male actors
Argentine male film actors
Living people